Museum Ledge is the ledge is a flat sandstone bed about 25 m long and 9 to 12 m wide exposed by erosion. The feature is a fossil locality. It contains excellently displayed fossil wood and is located on the southwest shoulder of Mount Glossopteris in the Ohio Range, Horlick Mountains. The name alludes to the display of fossil wood found here and was suggested by William E. Long, geologist with the Ohio State University expedition who worked in these mountains in the 1960-61 and 1961-62 austral summers.

References

Ridges of Marie Byrd Land